Arcadia is a town in Wayne County, New York, United States.  The population was 14,244 at the 2010 census.

The Town of Arcadia is on the south border of the county and is east of Rochester, New York.

The primary postal district covering the Town of Arcadia is ZIP Code 14513 for Newark.

History 

The town was first settled circa 1791.
  
The Town of Arcadia was formed from the Town of Lyons in 1825.

An asylum for the mentally disabled was established in Arcadia in 1789.

Hydesville, New York was a hamlet in the Town of Arcadia.  It no longer exists, but was the hometown of the spiritualist Fox Sisters.

In 1957, the Bergen Swamp Preservation Society acquired Zurich Bog for conservation.

The town is part of the Erie Canalway National Heritage Corridor.

Geography
 
The Erie Canal passes across the town and through the Village of Newark. The east end of "the Wide Waters," a wide part of the canal, is in the town.

The terrain contains many drumlins from past glaciation as well as the Zurich Bog.

The southern town line is the border of Ontario County.

New York State Route 31 (east-west) intersects New York State Route 88 in Newark, just south of the Erie Canal.

Demographics

As of the census of 2010, there were 14,244 people, 5,792 households, and 3,632 families residing in the town. The population density was 273.4 people per square mile (105.5/km2). The racial makeup of the town was 89.3% White, 4.6% Black or African American, 0.3% Native American, 0.5% Asian, 0.1% Pacific Islander, 2.2% from other races, and 2.9% from two or more races. Hispanic or Latino of any race were 6.8% of the population.

There were 5,792 households, out of which 26.6% had children under the age of 18 living with them, 43.2% were married couples living together, 14.4% had a female householder with no husband present, and 37.3% were non-families. 30.6% of all households were made up of individuals, and 11.9% had someone living alone who was 65 years of age or older. The average household size was 2.38 and the average family size was 2.93.

In the town, the population was spread out, with 24.8% under the age of 20, 5.9% from 20 to 24, 22.7% from 25 to 44, 30.3% from 45 to 64, and 16.4% who were 65 years of age or older. The median age was 42.4 years. For every 100 females, there were 93.6 males. For every 100 females age 18 and over, there were 91.2 males.

The median income for a household in the town was $44,993, and the median income for a family was $54,415. Males had a median income of $38,636 versus $33,172 for females. The per capita income for the town was $22,331. About 12.2% of families and 15.0% of the population were below the poverty line, including 22.3% of those under age 18 and 10.8% of those age 65 or over.

Housing
There were 6,194 housing units at an average density of 118.9 per square mile (45.9/km2). 6.5% of housing units were vacant.

There were 5,792 occupied housing units in the town. 3,798 were owner-occupied units (65.6%), while 1,994 were renter-occupied (34.4%). The homeowner vacancy rate was 1.8% of total units. The rental unit vacancy rate was 6.3%.

Communities and locations in the Town of Arcadia 
Arcadia — The former community of Arcadia is now part of the Village of Newark.
Austin — A hamlet containing the "Maple Ridge" and bordering with the town of Sodus. Along Maple Ridge Road and Austin Road.
Brantling Hill — A large drumlin in the northeast corner of the town. It is the location of a ski slope.
Fairville — A hamlet near the town's center along state Route 88.
Fairville Station — A hamlet northeast of Newark along Fairville Station Road, Heidenreich Road Coleman Hill Road and Arcadia Zurich Norris Road.
Hydesville — A hamlet north of Newark village on Hydesville Road and Parker Road.  The hamlet is called the birthplace of Modern Spiritualism, due to the events of natives Kate and Margaret Fox.
Marbletown — A hamlet on Marbletown Road (County Road 336), Miller Road and Silver Hill Road near the south town line. 
Minsteed — A hamlet in the northwest corner of the town, on Martin Road, Skinner Road, and Minsteed Road.
Mud Mills — A hamlet northeast of Newark on Welcher Road (County Road 234.), Mud Mills Road, and Sleight Road.
Newark — The Village of Newark, located on the Erie Canal and the intersection of NY-31 and NY-88.
Stebbins Corner — A location west of Hydesville on Tellier Road (County Road 225.)
Whitings Corners — A hamlet just north of Newark, southwest of Mud Mills, and east of Hydesville.
Zurich — A location in the northeast corner of the town on Zurich Road (County Road 237), Bramer Road, Lembke Road, Deneef Road and Layton Street Road. Has a portion in the town of Lyons.
Zurich Bog — A swamp west of Zurich is the lowest point in the town and a registered national landmark. It is also known as "Mud Pond," an open body of water within the bog.  It was called "Big Swamp" to the early settlers and "Bottomless Pit" to natives.  The swamp is about three  miles long and a mile wide.

Notable people
 Electa Amanda Wright Johnson (1938-1929), philanthropist, writer

See also

 List of towns in New York

References

http://www.waynepost.com/article/20140525/News/140529944

External links

 Town of Arcadia (official website)
 Newark-Arcadia Historical Society & Museum
  Historical summary of Arcadia
  Bergen Swamp Preservation Society
  Historical links for Arcadia

Rochester metropolitan area, New York
Towns in Wayne County, New York
1825 establishments in New York (state)